Jireček may refer to:

 Hermenegild Jireček (1827-1909), Bohemian jurisconsult
 Josef Jireček (1825-1888), a 19th-century Czech scholar
 Konstantin Josef Jireček (1854-1918), Josef's son and a fellow scholar
 Jireček Line, a conceptual line between ancient Greek and Latin spheres of influence in the Balkans
 Jireček Point, a point on the northwest coast of Smith Island in the South Shetland Islands
 Irechek (village), Kavarna Municipality, Dobrich Province, Bulgaria

See also
 Jiráček

Czech-language surnames
Patronymic surnames
Surnames from given names